Downers Grove Township is one of nine townships in DuPage County, Illinois, USA.  As of the 2010 census, its population was 146,795 and it contained 60,438 housing units.  It is the largest township in the county, both in terms of area and population.

History
Downers Grove Township is named for Pierce Downer, who settled in the neighborhood about 1830.

In the mid 1800s Dexter Stanley donated land to build the Oak Hill Cemetery. Along with the adjacent Oak Crest Cemetery, both are still used today as Township maintained Cemeteries.

Geography

Cities, towns, villages
 Bolingbrook (small portion)
 Burr Ridge (half)
 Clarendon Hills
 Darien
 Downers Grove (mostly)
 Hinsdale (mostly)
 Lemont (part)
 Oak Brook (small portion)
 Westmont (mostly)
 Willow Springs (partial - non residential)
 Willowbrook
 Woodridge (part)

Unincorporated towns
 Fullersburg at 
 Lace at 
 Palisades at 
(This list is based on USGS data and may include former settlements.)

Extinct towns
 Cass at 
 Gostyn at 
 Tedens at 
(These towns are listed as "historical" by the USGS.)

Cemeteries
The township contains these cemeteries: Cass, Clarendon Hills, Downers Grove, Fullersburg, Hinsdale Animal, Oak Crest, Oak Hill, Pierce Downer, Saint Johns Lutheran, Saint Mary of Gostyn and Saint Patricks Catholic, Zion Lutheran.

Major highways
  Interstate 55
  Interstate 88
  Interstate 355
  U.S. Route 34
  U.S. Route 66
  Illinois Route 83

Airports and landing strips
 Argonne Heliport
 Brookeridge Airpark 
 Darien-Woodridge Fire Department Heliport
 Madison Avenue Venture Heliport
 Midwest Heliport

Rivers
 Des Plaines River

Lakes
 Bruce Lake
 Darien Lake
 Golfview Lake
 Lake Charles
 Lake Hinsdale
 Maple Lake
 Picadilly Lake
 Ruth Lake
 Timber Lake
 Twin Lakes (Westmont)

Landmarks
 Argonne National Laboratory
 DuPage County Waterfall Glen Forest Preserve

Adjacent townships
 York Township (north)
 Milton Township (northwest)
 Lisle Township (west)
 Lyons Township, Cook County (east)
 Lemont Township, Cook County (south)
 Proviso Township, Cook County (northwest)
 Palos Township, Cook County (southeast)
 DuPage Township, Will County (west southwest)

Demographics

School districts
Elementary School Districts:
Butler 53, Cass 63, Center Cass 66, 180, Darien 61, Downers Grove Grade 58, Gower 62, Hinsdale 181, Lemont-Bromberek 113A, Maercker 60
High School Districts:
CHSD 99, Hinsdale Township 86, Lemont Township 210
Unit School Districts:
Westmont Community Unit School District 201

Political districts
 Illinois' 6th Congressional District
 Illinois' 8th Congressional District
 Illinois' 11th Congressional District
 State House District 47
 State House District 81
 State House District 82
 State Senate District 24
 State Senate District 41

References
 
 United States Census Bureau 2008 TIGER/Line Shapefiles
 United States National Atlas

External links
 City-Data.com
 Illinois State Archives
 Township Officials of Illinois
 Downers Grove Township

Townships in DuPage County, Illinois
Downers Grove, Illinois
Populated places established in 1849
1849 establishments in Illinois
Townships in Illinois